PBC Lokomotiv Kuban is a Russian professional basketball team based in Krasnodar. The club participates in the VTB United League.

The team is one of the top tier basketball teams in Russia. The team's honour list includes a EuroCup championship in the 2012–13 season, and two Russian Cup victories in 1999-00 and 2017–18.

History
The history of the Lokomotiv starts back in 1946 in Mineralnye Vody. Lokomotiv played in the first league championship for a number of years, until in 1994 it finally got into the elite of the national basketball. In 1999, Lokomotiv got the right to represent Russia in the European tournaments, such as the FIBA Korać Cup and won the Cup of the International Railways Sports Union. Lokomotiv won 3rd place in the Russian League in 2001, and playing in the Korać Cup finals in 2002.

The season 2002–03 became the final for the team from Mineralnye Vody. Lokomotiv hardly reached the play-off, taking the 8th place out of 10, where it lost to the champion CSKA Moscow in all three matches. The decision was hence made to move the club to a more developed and economically growing area – Rostov region. The basketball club Lokomotiv Rostov was established in 2003 in Rostov-on-Don.

During the next six years, the club played in the city of Don. The best achievement of the Lokomotiv during these years was the 5th place in the Russian National Championship (2006–07 season) and the finals of the FIBA Europe Cup (2004–05 season). In the summer of 2009, the president of the Russian Railways, Vladimir Yakunin, made the decision to move the club from Rostov-on-Don to Krasnodar. The main reason for that was that the arenas in Rostov were not satisfying the requirements of the Russian National Championship and the club's European tournaments.

First year in Krasnodar (2009–2010)
After relocating to Krasnodar, Lokomotiv changed its name to Lokomotiv Kuban. Sašo Filipovski was named the head coach. Lokomotiv had a great start to the season, which included an away win against CSKA and settled on the second place in standings for the first half of the season. However, the second half of the season was not that successful, as losses became far more often and by the end of 2009, Lokomotiv plummeted in the standings. Lokomotiv Kuban also played in the EuroChallenge, but lost all six games in the regular season, and soon, Filipovski was replaced by the Lithuanian national basketball team head coach – Kęstutis Kemzūra. Gerald Green, who joined the team in December, and center Grigory Shukhovtsov got an invitation to the Russian national basketball team at the end of the season. In the Russian League, despite elimination in the quarterfinals at the hands of Dynamo Moscow, Lokomotiv Kuban finished in 5th place.

2010–11 season
Under the direction of coach Kęstutis Kemzūra, Lokomotiv in the PBL League finished 4th, after a loss in the semifinals to champions CSKA Moscow and a loss in the bronze medal series to EuroCup champions UNICS Kazan. Lead by Jeremiah Massey, Mike Wilkinson and Lionel Chalmers, Lokomotiv in the FIBA EuroChallenge went all the way to the finals - despite being favorites to win, Lokomotiv lost to KK Krka 77:83 in the finals. The success in the tournament lead to Lokomotiv, along with champion Krka, qualifying to the EuroCup, the second tier competition in Europe.

2011–12 season

In the 2011–12 season, Lokomotiv Kuban signed coach Božidar Maljković - the team made their debut in the EuroCup tournament - lead by Massey and Ali Traore, Lokomotiv had success in the regular season and the Top16, where they finished 1st in their group, reaching the quarterfinals, where they were eliminated by future champion Khimki. Lokomotiv won the bronze medals in the Russian League over BC Triumph Lyubertsy.

The club from Krasnodar also made its debut in the VTB United League. A loss in the semifinals to UNICS Kazan 86:87 prevented the team from reaching the finals. In the 3rd place game, Lokomotiv lost to BC Lietuvos rytas 83:91.

2012–13 season
Evgeny Pashutin took the position of the Loko's head coach for season. Building an almost entirely new team, Lokomotiv signed players like Nick Calathes, Mantas Kalnietis, Aleks Marić, Derrick Brown, Alexey Savrasenko, Simas Jasaitis, Valery Likhodey. During the season, the team also signed Richard Hendrix to strengthen the roster.  Lokomotiv struggled in the regular season, but wins over Galatasaray and BC Donetsk helped Lokomotiv finish in first place in their group. Reaching the Top16, Lokomotiv dominated - the addition of Hendrix and play by Brown lead to Lokomtiv easily finishing 1st in the group, and getting home court advantage for the EuroCup playoffs. In the playoffs, Lokomotiv beat KK Budućnost in the quarterfinals, and Valencia Basket in the semifinals. In the finals, held in Charleroi, Lokomotiv faced Bilbao Basket, last year's EuroLeague playoff participant. Lokomotiv  won the game 75:64. Calathes was named EuroCup MVP, while Hendrix won the Finals MVP award.

In the VTB United League, now the top domestic competition, Lokomotiv struggled in the regular season, before the playoffs - reaching the finals, facing CSKA Moscow in the final series. Lokomotiv lost 1:3.

2013–14 season
Team leader Nick Calathes left the team for the NBA, and Lokomotiv signed Krunoslav Simon to replace him. Debuting in the EuroLeague, Lokomotiv finished with a 6–4 record and a trip to the Top16. Team leader Derrick Brown was the MVP of November in the EuroLeague. 

In the Top16, Lokomotiv fought in a tough group, with CSKA Moscow, Maccabi Tel Aviv and Real Madrid. Fighting for a final spot in the EuroLeague playoffs, Lokomotiv lost to Galatasaray, thus being eliminated from contention and finished the Top16 with a 7–7 record. In the VTB League, Lokomotiv faced CSKA Moscow in a rematch of the finals, this time in the quarterfinals - Lokomotiv shocked CSKA with two away wins, 87:83 and 81:66, in Moscow. Needing just one win to eliminate CSKA, Lokomotiv, however, suffered a fiasco - CSKA won the next two games in Krasnodar 76:73 and 79:78, before finishing the series by crushing Lokomotiv 84:65 in the deciding game in Moscow, winning the series 3:2 and eliminating Lokomotiv from the VTB League. Coach Pashutin left after the season.

2014–15 season
Sergei Bazarevich was named the new head coach in the off-season, and together with the club's management he started forming the new roster. Marcus Williams, Aleks Marić, Valery Likhodey, Simas Jasaitis and Mantas Kalnietis left the team. Lokomotiv then signed Anthony Randolph, Malcolm Delaney, Aaron Miles, Nikita Kurbanov, Evgeny Voronov and Nikita Balashov. In the EuroCup, Lokomotiv entered the playoffs with a 16 consecutive wins, and defeated Brose Bamberg in the first round of the playoffs. In the quarterfinals, Lokomotiv faced UNICS Kazan, coached by Pashutin. After winning the first game 87:78, Lokomotiv had won a competition record 19 consecutive games. In the rematch, however, Lokomotiv suffered a total fiasco, losing 58:79 and shockingly being eliminated from the competition. Needing to qualify for the EuroLeague, Lokomotiv now had to reach the finals of the VTB League. Lokomotiv got their revenge on UNICS, sweeping them 3:0 in the quarterfinals, but suffered more heartbreak as they could not defeat Khimki in the semifinals, losing the series 2:3. The high hopes for the season ended with a total fiasco for the team.

Rise to the EuroLeague Final Four (2015–2016) 

Lokomotiv Kuban hired Georgios Bartzokas as their new head coach. Lokomotiv retained much of the roster, and also signed Chris Singleton, who quickly became one of the team leaders. They also received a wild card for the 2015–16 Euroleague. Lokomotiv finished in 1st place in the regular season, over teams like FC Barcelona and Panathinaikos. Finishing second in the Top16, Lokomotiv qualified to the playoffs. Lokomotiv achieved qualification to the 2016 Euroleague Final Four by beating FC Barcelona 3–2 in the playoffs. Malcolm Delaney and Anthony Randolph, who got places in the All-EuroLeague Teams. Their opponent during the Final Four semifinal would be fellow Russian team CSKA Moscow. Lokomotiv lost 81:88. However, Lokomotiv recovered and beat Laboral Kutxa 85:75 in the 3rd place game. However, in the VTB League, Lokomotiv finished only 5th in the regular season, and lost to Khimki 0:3 in the quarterfinals, losing a chance to compete in the 2016-2017 Euroleague.

2016-2019 
On 14 November 2016, Lokomotiv signed new head coach Saša Obradović, who replaced the departed Bartzokas. Team leaders Delaney, Randolph and Singleton departed. Coach Obradović built a team based on teamwork, signing players like Taylor Rochestie, Matt Janning, Kevin Jones, Mardy Collins and Ian Vougioukas. Lokomotiv initially struggled in the EuroCup, barely entering the Top16 phase. However, the play improved and Lokomotiv finished in 1st place in the Top16, getting home court advantage for the playoffs. They easily defeated VTB rival BC Zenit Saint Petersburg 2:0 in the quarterfinals. Facing Unicaja Malaga, Lokomotiv were again favorites - however, Unicaja shocked everyone and won the first game in Krasnodar, 73:57, stealing home-court advantage from Lokomotiv. In the second game, this time in Malaga, Unicaja dominated from the start and won 74:63, winning the series 2:0 and eliminating Lokomotiv from the competition. In the 2016–17 VTB United League, Lokomotiv finished 4th in the regular season, getting home court advantage over UNICS Kazan, who took Lokomotiv's place in the 2016-2017 EuroLeague. Lokomotiv eliminated UNICS 3:1, and faced CSKA in the semifinals. Lokomotiv took the fight against the defending champions - losing the series 0:3.

Coach Obradović remained with the team for the 2017–2018 season. Ryan Broekhoff and Mardy Collins remained with the team, while Lokomotiv also signed Frank Elegar, Joe Ragland and Dmitry Kulagin. Lokomotiv won the Russian Basketball Cup with Kulagin being named the MVP. Lokomotiv quickly became one of the top teams of the EuroCup, finishing the regular season with 10–0 record. Lokomotiv continued to dominate in the Top16, ending with a 6–0 record and a combined 16–0 record heading into the playoffs. Entering the quarterfinals, Lokomotiv didn't stop - they beat Herbalife Gran Canaria 2:0 in the quarterfinals, and Grissin Bon Reggio Emilia 2:0 in the semifinals, breaking their own 2014-2015 streak by winning 20 consecutive games in the EuroCup. In the finals, Lokomotiv faced Darüşşafaka - Lokomotiv were the heavy favorites to win the tournament and enter the EuroLeague. However, Darüşşafaka shocked Lokomotiv by snapping their winning streak in the first match in Krasnodar, with Lokomotiv losing an overtime thriller 78:81. In the rematch, the shocked Lokomotiv lost 59:67, losing the EuroCup finals 0:2. In the VTB League, the format was changed to a final four, with the winners of the quarterfinals qualifying. Lokomotiv faced EuroLeague playoff participant Khimki in the quarterfinals. Lokomotiv, despite home court advantage, lost the first two games, before losing the deciding one in Moscow - losing the series 0:3 and ending the season with disappointment.

The 2018–2019 season was a very turbulent one - with three coaching changes. After a disappointing start, coach Obradović was replaced by assistant Vlada Jovanović. Lokomotiv, once again a favorite to win the EuroCup, finished the regular season with a 9–1 record.  In the Top16 of the EuroCup, Lokomotiv finished second with a 4–2 record, losing first place to LDLC ASVEL, qualifying to the playoffs, but without homecourt advantage. In the quarterfinals, UNICS Kazan defeated Lokomotiv 2:1, ending the EuroCup campaign. The disappointing finish lead to Jovanović being fired, with Lokomotiv signing Bob Donewald Jr. as the new head coach for the team. Lokomotiv finished fourth in the VTB League regular season. Lokomotiv faced Zenit Saint Petersburg, and despite homecourt advantage, Zenit defeated Lokomotiv 3:1.

2020–present
On February 28, 2022, EuroLeague Basketball suspended the team because of the 2022 Russian invasion of Ukraine. Americans Greg Whittington, Johnathan Motley, Stanton Kidd, and Darius Thompson all left the team after the Russian invasion.

Arenas
Lokomotiv-Kuban played its home games at the 3,500-seat Olympus Arena, prior to moving to the newer and larger 7,500-seat Basket-Hall Krasnodar.

Honours and achievement

Domestic
Russian Cup
Winners (2): 1999–00,  2017–18
Runners-up (1): 2013–14

International
EuroLeague
Third place (1): 2015–16
 Final Four (1): 2016
EuroCup
Winners (1): 2012–13
Runners-up (1): 2017–18
FIBA Korać Cup
Runners-up (1): 2001–02
FIBA EuroChallenge
Runners-up (1): 2010–11

Regional
VTB United League
Runners-up (1): 2013
FIBA Europe Conference North
Runners-up (1): 2004–05

Other competitions
Bursa Cevat Soydas Tournament
Winners (1): 2019

Season by season

Players

Current roster

Management
 President – Andrey Vedischev
 Management Board chairman – Anatoly Mescheryakov
 Vice-President for Development – Boris Tikhonenko
 Executive Director – Novikov Nikolay

Coaching staff
 Head Coach – Branko Maksimović
 Assisting Coach – Jovan Beader
 Youth Loko-2 Head Coach – Zakhar Pashutin

Notable players

 Afik Nissim
 Nikita Morgunov
 Nikita Kurbanov
 Aleksandar Ćapin
 Mindaugas Kuzminskas
 Mantas Kalnietis
 Simas Jasaitis
 Eurelijus Žukauskas
 Giedrius Gustas
 Artūras Masiulis
 Szymon Szewczyk
 Victor Claver
/ Asım Pars
/ Moon Tae-Jong
 Chris Babb
 Lorinza Harrington
 Anthony Goldwire
 Fred House
 Rawle Marshall
 Chris Lofton
 James Gist
 Josh Powell
 Anthony Randolph
 Marcus Williams
 Nick Calathes
 Gerald Green
 Malcolm Delaney
 Dorell Wright

Head coaches
 Evgeniy Pashutin
 Aleksandar Petrović
 Božidar Maljković
 Saša Obradović
 Kęstutis Kemzūra
 Danijel Jusup
 Sašo Filipovski
 Sergei Bazarevich
 Georgios Bartzokas

References

External links
 Official website 
 Official website 
 Eurobasket.com Team Page

 
Basketball teams in Russia
Basketball teams established in 1946
Railway sports teams
Basketball teams in the Soviet Union